Rock-a-Doodle is a 1991 independent live-action/animated musical comedy film produced by Sullivan Bluth Studios and Goldcrest Films. Loosely based on Edmond Rostand's 1910 comedy play Chantecler, Rock-a-Doodle was directed by Don Bluth and written by David N. Weiss. The film features the voices of Glen Campbell, Christopher Plummer, Phil Harris (in his final film role), Charles Nelson Reilly, Sorrell Booke, Sandy Duncan, Eddie Deezen, Ellen Greene, and Toby Scott Ganger (in his film debut).

The film tells the story of an anthropomorphic rooster named Chanticleer, who lives on a farm and crows every morning to raise the sun. However, he leaves his farm to become a singer in the city after being tricked by the Grand Duke of Owls, whose kind hates sunshine, into thinking that his crow does not actually raise the sun. Without Chanticleer, rain continues to pour non-stop, causing a massive flood all over the country. The Duke and his henchmen take over in the darkness, and plan to eat all of the barnyard animals. Chanticleer's friends from the farm, along with Edmond, a young human boy who was transformed into a kitten by the Duke, take off on a mission to get Chanticleer to bring back the sun and save the country before it is too late. 

Rock-a-Doodle was released in the United Kingdom on 2 August 1991 and in the United States and Canada on 3 April 1992. The film was a critical and commercial failure, grossing $11 million worldwide against a $18 million production budget. It was criticized for its dark nature, live-action sequences, narration, and special effects, while the animation style and voice acting were praised.

Plot 

One morning, Chanticleer, a rooster whose singing raises the sun every morning, gets into a fight with a stranger sent by the Grand Duke of Owls, whose kind hates sunlight. Chanticleer defeats his attacker, but forgets to crow, and the sun rises anyway. Ridiculed and rejected by the other animals, Chanticleer leaves the farm in shame, and the sun goes back down as Chanticleer had not crowed. Afterward, perpetual darkness and rainfall threaten the farm with flooding.

This story turns out to be a fairy-tale being read to a young boy named Edmond by his mother. Their family's farm is in danger of being destroyed in a storm, and when his mother leaves to assist the rest of the family, Edmond calls for Chanticleer's return. However, he's instead greeted by the Duke, who is angered by Edmond's interference and uses his magical breath to transform Edmond into a kitten with the intent to devour him. Edmond is saved by Patou, a basset hound from Chanticleer's farm who struggles to tie his shoes, and Edmond manages to drive away the Duke with a flashlight. Edmond then meets several other animals from the farm, all of whom are hoping to find Chanticleer and apologize to him for their behavior. Edmond accompanies Patou, a cowardly magpie named Snipes, and the intellectual field mouse, Peepers, to the city, while the rest of the animals remain at Edmond's house.

Hunch, the Duke's pygmy nephew, is assigned by him to stop Edmond and the others from finding Chanticleer. The group narrowly escapes him and enters the city through an aqueduct pipe. Chanticleer, now under the name of "The King", has become a famous Elvis impersonator under his manager Pinky Fox, who is employed by the Duke to keep Chanticleer in the city and prevent his friends from finding him. During a concert, he is introduced to Goldie Pheasant as a distraction in case Chanticleer's friends come to find him. Goldie soon grows genuinely attracted to Chanticleer, and realizes Pinky's true intentions when he captures Edmond and the others trying to get a letter to Chanticleer. Meanwhile, the Duke and his party stalk the farm animals at Edmond's house, who continually use Edmond's flashlight to drive them off as long as the batteries hold out. Realizing that she is in love with him, Goldie confesses to Chanticleer that his friends had come to see him, and Pinky blackmails Chanticleer by giving him a demand to attend his show or never see his friends again. Hunch inadvertently frees Edmond and the others, and they help Chanticleer and Goldie make a grand escape in a helicopter, which they use to return to the farm.

After their batteries run out, the denizens of the farm are nearly made a meal of by the Duke and his minions when they are driven off by the helicopter's spotlight. Edmond and the others try to get Chanticleer to crow, but his ongoing sense of dejection limits his ability. The Duke taunts Chanticleer and tries to drown him, but Edmond starts chanting Chanticleer's name in hopes of reviving his spirit, provoking the Duke into strangling Edmond until he loses consciousness. Impressed by Edmond's bravery, the other animals begin chanting Chanticleer's name, driving an angry Duke to transform himself into a tornado. Chanticleer finally regains his confidence and crows loud enough to raise the sun, diminishing the Duke into a harmless miniature version of himself. He is then chased away by a vengeful Hunch into the distance once and for all. The floods begin to subside and Edmond transforms back into a human. Edmond awakes in the real world, where the sun is shining outside, and the floods have ended, but Edmond's mother assumes that his adventures were only a dream. Nevertheless, Edmond picks up Chanticleer's book, and thanks him for coming back, before he is magically transported into Chanticleer's world, where he witnesses the rooster singing to make the sun shine.

Cast 
 Toby Scott Ganger as Edmond, the 6-year-old son of a human farmer who is being read the story of Chanticleer by his mother, Dory. He is transformed into a kitten by the Grand Duke after trying to summon back Chanticleer. Although his human form was lost thanks to the Duke, Edmond organizes the farm animals to bring Chanticleer back to the farm after the flooding starts. He slowly begins to learn the errors of his ways and stops being afraid. This is Ganger's first acting role.
 Glen Campbell as Chanticleer, a rooster who lives on a farm with many other animals, who are fond of and love him. When the sun rises without his crowing, his friends, believing he was lying to them about his crowing bringing up the sun (a fact he himself thought was true), reject him, leading to the adventures of Edmond and the others. In a miserable state, he goes to the city and becomes a popular singer. Through his manager Pinky, he meets Goldie and falls in love at first sight with her. Soon though, his friends come to the city and apologize. He and Goldie are then brought back to the farm, so he can save it. He is based on the late superstar Elvis Presley, who passed away in 1977.
 Phil Harris as Patou (Narrator), a Basset Hound who is a good friend to both Chanticleer and Edmond, and plays the narrator character of the story. He despises the Grand Duke and is dedicated to Edmond's cause to bring Chanticleer back home. He is brave and reasonable, but somewhat temperamental. His endeavor to find Chanticleer is hampered by the fact that he does not know how to tie his shoes (which he wears because of bunions, in which it is a running gag). However, in the end, he finally figures out how to tie them right, after Edmond teaches him. Harris retired from acting and died in 1995.
 Christopher Plummer as the Grand Duke of Owls, a magical owl who despises Chanticleer. He overhears Edmond's call for Chanticleer in the real world and plans to eat him alive as a death penalty. First, he transforms Edmond into a kitten to make him "more digestible" like other kittens, but on his dismay, Patou stops the Duke from eating Edmond just in time. The Duke is a malevolent powerful creature of the night, with a penchant for eating smaller animals as meals and commanding other villainous owls to do his bidding. He hates sunlight, like all owls, and recoils when light shines on him. Also, he possesses magical breath that can transform anyone into any creature, as exampled when he turns Edmond into his kitten form. He manages to seemingly kill Edmond by strangling him to death with his magic breath, when he is attempting to restore Chanticleer's crowing spirit at the cost of his own life. He is chased away by Hunch near the very end of the film after being shrunken to a size smaller than that of Hunch and the mice and chicks on the farm, driving the both of them far away from Chanticleer's farm. In a deleted scene of the film, he nearly eats a skunk that he has stuffed (live) into a pie, but thanks to Hunch's clumsiness, the skunk escapes. In the final version of that scene, however, it is unknown what kind of pie the Duke is baking.
 Ellen Greene as Goldie, a pheasant and singer who is in Pinky's employment. She is initially jealous of Chanticleer for stealing her spotlight, but falls in love with him upon becoming more acquainted with him. Pinky initially tells her that Edmond is a bad kitty, but when Pinky has Edmond and his friends tied up, she realizes that they are actually Chanticleer's friends, and tells Chanticleer that they tried to get a message to him. After this, Chanticleer manages to escape the set of Pinky's new movie, and returns to the farm with his friends, Edmond, and Goldie. Goldie stays with Chanticleer on the farm, they get married and have two children.
 Eddie Deezen as Snipes, a magpie. He, Edmond, Patou, and Peepers travel to the city in a toybox floating on the floodwaters, with Snipes more interested in exploring the city and its sights than actually helping his friends. Being claustrophobic, this poses a problem when he pokes holes in the box trying to escape and reach open air. He despises garbage and dirt, but loves the food served in the city when they go inside a restaurant where Chanticleer sings, particularly lasagna.
 Sandy Duncan as Peepers, a mouse. Because of this, she is initially terrified of Edmond, but he tries to convince everyone that he used to be a boy. She was willing to accept him for being a cat if he took her and the others to the city. It is not until the very end of the film that she believes him and comments "oh, he was a handsome little boy..." She has a lisp and very round glasses, and is constantly arguing with Snipes's chauvinistic views.
 Charles Nelson Reilly as Hunch, the Duke's pygmy nephew and lead henchman. Hunch enjoys rhyming words with "aggravation" and humming "The Ride of the Valkyries". He is dimwitted, but extremely aggressive. He carries an all-purpose Swiss Army Knife in a lidless soda can strapped to his back and uses its various bladed objects, tools, and household objects (such as a flyswatter) as weapons. A small running gag in the film was that whenever the Duke would breathe on him, his magic would transform Hunch into a randomly different creature. In the end, Hunch gets the upper hand, and chases his abusive uncle away with his flyswatter.
 Sorrell Booke as Pinky, a Southern fox who loves money and golf. He is also Chanticleer's manager in the city. His job is to ensure that Chanticleer never feels the compulsion to return home by convincing him that his friends hate him, making it easy to profit off of Chanticleer's singing skills. He secretly works for the Duke and lies to Goldie about Edmond being a "bad kitty". Chanticleer and Goldie, who have fallen in love with each other, escape with Edmond's friends, foiling Pinky's plans and destroying his limousine simultaneously. This was Booke's final film role.
 Will Ryan as Stuey, a chronically nervous pig from Chanticleer's farm. Whenever anyone mentions the owls, he starts to freak out, and will sometimes snort and whimper. While Edmond, Snipes, Patou, and Peepers go to the city to return Chanticleer to the farm, he stays behind to keep the owls at bay. He is almost eaten by the Duke, but is saved when the group returns with Chanticleer, shining a helicopter light on the Duke.
 Louise Chamis as Minnie, a rabbit from the farm.
 Bob Gallico as Radio Announcer
 Jake Steinfeld as Farmyard Bully, a rooster and minion of the Duke sent by him to stop Chanticleer from crowing. Steinfeld also voiced Max the Bouncer, the leader of a group of bouncer frogs who are Pinky's henchmen.
 T. J. Kuenster, Jim Doherty, John Drummond, and Frank Kelly as the Duke's owl henchmen.
 Kathryn Holcomb as Dory, Edmond's mother
 Stan Ivar as Frank, Edmond's father
 Christian Hoff as Scott, one of Edmond's older brothers
 Jason Marin as Mark, one of Edmond's older brothers

Production

Development 
Plans for an animated version of the Chanticleer tale dated as far back as the early years of the Disney studios, where several of its artists were interested in combining elements of the story with those about an anthropomorphic fox named Reynard. Though character designs by Marc Davis survive, Walt Disney personally rejected the pitch in 1961, eventually passing on the project in favor of The Sword in the Stone. Eleven years later, Don Bluth, himself a former Disney animator, had begun pre-production on an fully animated film based on Chanticleer in 1982, before the release of The Secret of NIMH. In 1985, the film was mentioned as being in development limbo. Three years later, as a response to the success of the groundbreaking live-action animated film Who Framed Roger Rabbit, Bluth ultimately revived his proposal, intending to tell the rooster's story through live action and animation. Originally, the story's first and last scenes were to be shot in black and white, similar to 1939's The Wizard of Oz. The film's opening, which took place at a farm, had Edmond's mother reading the book The Story of Chanticleer to him. Victor French, who had directed several episodes of Get Smart and Highway to Heaven, was set to direct these sequences, but terminal lung cancer forced him out of production. Bluth, who had never done anything in this field, took over from this point. However, very little of this footage made it in the final cut.

In a 1990 magazine article, Don described the plot of the film thusly: "ROCK-A-DOODLE is a fantasy, something that we just made up. It's about a character named Chanticleer who thinks that when he crows the sun comes up. The truth is, it does; until one day into the farm yard comes another rooster who fights with Chanticleer and keeps him so busy that the sun, who has a habit of coming up every morning at that time, peeks its little head over the hill. Well, Chanticleer has not crowed and when he sees that the sun has come up without him, he's devastated. All the farm yard animals ridicule and laugh at him, so he walks away and says 'I'm nobody'. The sun becomes very upset after that and hides behind the clouds never to come out again. Meanwhile, the rooster goes away to the city and becomes a rock star, very reminiscent of Elvis Presley. The farm yard animals realize they're in trouble because the rains have come, the world's flooding, and there's no more sunshine. So they go to the city and try to bring Chanticleer home to crow". In the final film, however, it is never explained why the sun rises even though Chanticleer does not crow, despite how much the narration of the film tries to explain many things.

Filming 
The live-action sequences were done at Ardmore Studios in Dublin, Ireland. When the live-action footage was finished during production, Goldcrest Films recruited Sullivan Bluth Studios to animate the rest of the film. Animation took place in both Burbank, California and Dublin, Ireland. Chanticleer's girlfriend, Goldie the Pheasant, was designed to have attributes similar to Jessica Rabbit from Who Framed Roger Rabbit (as seen in the original trailer). In response to reactions from mothers during test screenings of her scenes, Goldcrest requested that Sullivan Bluth reanimate the scenes by covering her chest with feathers as cel overlays, or simply painting her cleavage out.

Aspect ratio 
The live-action and animation sequences were filmed in two separate aspect ratios. The animation was shot on an open-matte full-screen negative, meaning the top and bottom of the image was cropped to fit the theatre screen along with the new Olive Films DVD and Blu-ray releases. However, the live-action scenes, including all animated elements, were shot in hard-matted widescreen. When viewed in full-screen (except the theatre screen and the new Olive Films DVD and Blu-ray releases), all the animated sequences (except for parts of the finale) can be seen in full, but the live-action segments lose information on the sides.

Post-production 
To avoid a potential PG rating, Bluth edited out the showing of The Duke's "skunk pie" (the pie is not seen in full view in the final version), the animators had to replace Chanticleer's glass of wine with a transparent cup of soda in the "Kiss and Coo" sequence, and had to draw colored effects into The Grand Duke's breath to make him less scary for young audiences. Test audiences also felt confused by the storytelling so the filmmakers decided to include narration told by the dog character, Patou, voiced by Phil Harris. The crew, because of these changes, had to work overtime to finish the film by Thanksgiving 1990.

Release 
The film was originally going to be released by MGM-Pathe Communications Co in November 1990, but studio partnership was facing financial difficulties, so Bluth rescheduled the film for release around Thanksgiving 1991 and selected The Samuel Goldwyn Company as the film's distributor. That date was further moved to April 1992 to avoid competition with Walt Disney Pictures and Walt Disney Feature Animation's Beauty and the Beast, as well as Universal Pictures and Amblin Entertainment's An American Tail: Fievel Goes West, a sequel to An American Tail, in which Bluth himself was not involved. Prior to the North American theatrical release, a sneak preview of the film was included on the 1990 VHS release of All Dogs Go to Heaven.

Rock-a-Doodle was the first feature-length live-action/animated film since 1988's Who Framed Roger Rabbit, but unlike the live-action characters from that film sharing the screen with animated characters like Roger Rabbit, Edmond is the only live-action character to share the screen with the animated farm animals; this was at the beginning, when The Grand Duke confronts Edmond before turning him into an animated cat, and at the end, where Chanticleer is singing a reprise of Sun Do Shine like he does at the beginning. Bluth chose this direction because he was influenced by Roger Rabbit.

Home media history 

In the United States and Canada, Rock-a-Doodle was first released on VHS and LaserDisc on 18 August 1992, and then on DVD on 20 July 1999 by HBO Video. A second edition was released by MGM Home Entertainment through Sony Pictures Home Entertainment on 8 November 2005.

In 2010, the film was released along with The Pebble and the Penguin as a double-sided DVD. For the 25th anniversary of Rock-a-Doodle'''s North American release, a third edition was released on DVD and Blu-ray by Olive Films (under license from 20th Century Fox and MGM) on 31 October 2017. That edition marked the film's first widescreen debut in an American home media release. Unlike the previous home media releases, both the new Olive Films DVD and Blu-ray releases were sourced from telecine masters made for PAL, resulting in a slightly higher audio pitch than normal, despite the running time remaining the same as its NTSC counterpart.

 Reception 
 Box office 
The film took in $11,657,385 at the US box office after an opening weekend gross of $2,603,286, which forced Bluth's studio into liquidation half a year after its release. Moreover, a Hong Kong company, Media Assets, purchased Bluth's next three films, Thumbelina (1994), A Troll in Central Park (1994), and The Pebble and the Penguin (1995). None of these did any better than Rock-a-Doodle critically or commercially, except Thumbelina, which did get slightly better in critical reception. All of them preceded 1997's Anastasia, his comeback hit. Despite the film's dismal theatrical performance, the movie did sell quite well once it hit home video, shipping an estimated 2 million units, worth about $28 million gross.

 Critical reception Rock-a-Doodle received generally negative reviews from critics. In a positive review, The Washington Post wrote: "The young ones, who certainly don't give a sticky-fingered hoot about animation production values, are likely to have a good time with this. There are many passing delights. Composer T. J. Kuenster has some funny songs. They're not Ashman and Menken (The Little Mermaid songwriting team), but they're sprightly. The best is probably a Bach-like fugue number, in which the Grand Duke and his owlish goons sing "Never Let Him Crow" around a church organ. But in a movie like this, it ain't over till the rooster sings". Empire found it more compelling than Bluth's previous effort All Dogs Go to Heaven, labeling Chanticleer "good-natured kitsch" and praising the film's "successful if unspectacular" live-action/animation mixture and the use of the real-life Jordanaires as backing vocalists.Halliwell's Film Guide commended its "excellent animation", but complained of the "poor and confusing narrative" that "rendered [it] pointless". Roger Ebert of the Chicago Sun-Times gave the film two stars out of four. In his review, he gave mild praise to the songs and the animation and said the film may entertain younger audiences, but said the film "doesn't feel as bright as it should". He also called the live-action segments unnecessary. Dave Kehr of the Chicago Tribune criticized the film's overwhelming amount of characters and subplots as well as its "frantic" altering in pacing and tone, but acclaimed the hand-drawn animation, calling it superior to the "shabby rotoscoping techniques" of Beauty and the Beast (1991). Hartford Courant reviewer Malcolm L. Johnson, while feeling that Rock-a-Doodle lacked a story, highlighted its "technical feats" in animation, such as the use of live action and moments where the animation "zoomps us through layers of action, as though a camera were riding on the back of a freewheeling bird". He also praised the voice acting and "witty" take of the "Bach vs. rock" story.

Charles Soloman, a critic for the Los Angeles Times, disliked the film's writing, reasoning that it was filled with plot holes, forced "fun" elements, and rejection of the source material's "powerful message about the importance of self-knowledge". He also criticized its cheap-looking special effects: "The Grand Duke's magic breath sprays twinkling stars and crescent moons that look like the glitter sold by the scoop in card shops. The matte lines are clearly visible in the final live-action/animation scenes, and a weird glow suffuses the entire sequence, as if it had been shot at Chernobyl". Entertainment Weekly panned Rock-a-Doodle's "limp rock homages", forgettable song, "washed-out" colors, and the "cheap" look of the live-actions sequences.

In 2011, Total Film ranked it as 24th among the 50 worst children's films ever made.

 Music 

The soundtrack for Rock-a-Doodle was composed by Robert Folk and performed by the Irish Film Orchestra, with songs written and produced by T.J. Kuenster, one of the songwriters for All Dogs Go to Heaven. Background vocals on "We Hate the Sun", "Tweedle Te Dee", and "The Owls' Picnic" were all sung by a triple-tracked Kuenster himself. The tracks "Sun Do Shine", "Come Back to You", "Rock-a-Doodle", "Treasure Hunting Fever", "Sink or Swim", "Kiss 'n Coo", and "Tyin' Your Shoes" contained background vocals by The Jordanaires.

The soundtrack is the forty-ninth album by American singer/guitarist Glen Campbell, released in 1992. Campbell voiced the main character.  The soundtrack was recorded at The Music Mill, Nashville; Ropewalk Studios, Dublin, Ireland; and Devonshire Audio, Los Angeles. It was produced by T.J. Kuenster, Robert Folk, and Nicky Moss. The album was released on the Liberty Records label.

 Songs 

 Merchandise 
A novelization of the film, written by Don Bluth and Chip Lovitt, was published by Troll Communications LLC. The film also inspired a Computerized Coloring Book by Capstone Software and IntraCorp called The Rock-A-Doodle Computerized Coloring Book''.

See also 

 List of animated feature-length films

Notes

References

External links 

 
 
 
 
 
 

1991 animated films
1991 films
1990s fantasy comedy films
1990s musical comedy films
1990s musical fantasy films
American children's animated adventure films
American children's animated comedy films
American children's animated fantasy films
American children's animated musical films
American fantasy adventure films
American films with live action and animation
American musical comedy films
Animated films about birds
Animated films about cats
Animated films about dogs
Animated films about foxes
Animated films about revenge
British animated fantasy films
British children's animated films
British children's comedy films
British children's fantasy films
British fantasy adventure films
British musical fantasy films
Animated films about chickens
Films about size change
Films directed by Don Bluth
Films directed by Gary Goldman
Films directed by Dan Kuenster
Animated films about mice
Films produced by Don Bluth and Gary Goldman
Films produced by John Pomeroy
Films scored by Robert Folk
Films set on farms
Films with screenplays by Don Bluth
Films with screenplays by Gary Goldman
Films with screenplays by John Pomeroy
Films with screenplays by David N. Weiss
Goldcrest Films films
Irish animated fantasy films
Irish comedy films
Irish musical films
English-language Irish films
Rock musicals
Sullivan Bluth Studios films
The Samuel Goldwyn Company films
1991 comedy films
1990s children's animated films
1990s English-language films
Films about owls
1990s American films
1990s British films
American independent films
British independent films
Irish independent films